Yasin Said Numan (born 1948) is the former General Secretary of the Yemeni Socialist Party from 2005 to 2015. He is the current ambassador of Yemen to the United Kingdom since 2015.

Numan joined the Yemeni National Front, which later became the Yemeni Socialist Party, when he was 17. In 1986 he became the Prime Minister of the People's Democratic Republic of Yemen from February 1986 until Yemeni unification in 1990, under Chairman Haidar Abu Bakr al-Attas, who preceded Numan as Prime Minister. Numan had previously been Minister of Fisheries and Deputy Prime Minister.

After the Unification of Yemen Numan became the interim Speaker of Parliament, until the parliamentary election of 1993 when he was replaced by Abdullah ibn Husayn al-Ahmar. He became the General Secretary of the Yemeni Socialist Party in 2005.

During the Yemeni Revolution of 2011, Numan was critical of President Ali Abdullah Saleh and supported a plan by the GCC for Saleh to step down. He escaped from an assassination attempt in August 2012; he was one of several Socialist Party politicians targeted during 2012.

References

Prime Ministers of South Yemen
Speakers of the House of Representatives (Yemen)
Living people
Yemeni Socialist Party politicians
1948 births
Ambassadors of Yemen to the United Kingdom